Stornorrfors Hydroelectric Power Station is a hydroelectric power station on the Ume River in Västerbotten County, Sweden. The city of Umeå lies about 15 km southeast of the power station.

The power station was operational in 1958. It is owned by Vattenfall (75 %; municipality of Umeå 25 %) and operated by Vattenfall.

Dam
Stornorrfors Dam is a concrete gravity dam located about 4 km from the power station. A canal connects the reservoir with the power station.

Power station 
The power station contains 4 (or 5) Francis turbine-generators. The total nameplate capacity is 599.4 MW. Its average annual generation is 2,256 GWh. The hydraulic head is 75 m. Maximum flow is 975 m³/s.

The first 3 machines with 131 MW each went on line in 1958. The turbines were manufactured by NOHAB.

The fourth turbine with 187 MW was commissioned in 1982. The turbine was manufactured by Kværner.

See also

 List of hydroelectric power stations in Sweden

References

External links 

 
 

Dams in Sweden
Hydroelectric power stations in Sweden
Gravity dams
Dams completed in 1958
Energy infrastructure completed in 1958
1958 establishments in Sweden